Alan Yuille (born 1955) is a Bloomberg Distinguished Professor of Computational Cognitive Science with appointments in the departments of Cognitive Science and Computer Science  at Johns Hopkins University. Yuille develops models of vision and cognition for computers, intended for creating artificial vision systems. He studied under Stephen Hawking at Cambridge University on a PhD in theoretical physics, which he completed in 1981.

Biography 
Alan Yuille obtained a Bachelor of Arts degree in mathematics from the University of Cambridge in 1976, where he also earned his PhD in theoretical physics in 1981. He then completed a postdoctoral fellowship at the University of Texas at Austin and the University of California, Santa Barbara. Yuille served as a research scientist first at the Artificial Intelligence Laboratory at the Massachusetts Institute of Technology, where he stayed from 1982 until 1986, and then at Harvard University. Here, he was promoted to Assistant Professor of Computer Science in 1988 and Associate Professor in 1992. In 1995, he joined the Smith-Kettlewell Eye Research Institute in San Francisco as a Senior Research Scientist. In 2002, he was appointed as a full professor in the Department of Statistics at the University of California, Los Angeles with joint appointments in the departments of computer science, psychiatry, and psychology. He also served as co-director of the UCLA Center for Cognition, Vision, and Learning. In 2016, Yuille joined Johns Hopkins University as the Bloomberg Distinguished Professor of Computational Cognitive Science. The Bloomberg Distinguished Professorship program was established in 2013 by a gift from Michael Bloomberg to endow professors whose areas of expertise bridge traditional academic disciplines and promote cross-disciplinary research and collaboration. Yuille holds appointments in the Department of Cognitive Science in the Zanvyl Krieger School of Arts and Sciences and in the Department of Computer Science in the Whiting School of Engineering.

Research 
Yuille develops mathematical models of vision and cognition that enable computers to reconstruct three-dimensional structures based on images or videos. His research interests include computational models of vision, mathematical models of cognition, medical image analysis, and artificial intelligence and neural networks. He directs the Computational Cognition, Vision, and Learning (CCVL) research group at Johns Hopkins University. Yuille and the CCVL develop models for designing artificial vision systems to provide assistance for people with vision impairments; computational models of biological vision; computational models of cognition to study how humans and animals perform tasks such as learning and reasoning; and models for machine learning to interpret medical images.

Yuille is currently working on The Felix Project (named after the fictional potion Felix Felicis, which, in the world of Harry Potter, brings drinkers unusually good luck). The project aims to use deep learning to improve early detection of pancreatic cancer by training computers to recognize it in CT scans and magnetic resonance images. Yuille and collaborators are attempting to develop algorithms to interpret CT and MR images of the pancreas and distinguish between a normal pancreas and a pancreas with a range of pathologies including tumors.

Awards

 Helmholtz Test of Time Award, 2013
IEEE Fellow, 2009
Marr Prize, ICCV 2003
 Honorary mention Marr Prize, ICCV 1988
 Rayleigh Research Prize, 1979
 Rouse Ball Prizes, 1974, 75, 76, and 77

Publications
Yuille has over 300 publications including three books (one co-edited). He has more than 65,000 citations in Google Scholar and an h-index of 111.

Books
 Two- and Three- Dimensional Patterns of the Face, P.W. Hallinan, G. Gordon, A.L. Yuille, P.J. Giblin and D.B. Mumford, Research Monograph, A K Peters, Ltd. 1999.
 Active Vision, Eds. A. Blake and A.L. Yuille, MIT Press, Cambridge, MA, Oct. 1992. 
 Data Fusion for Sensory Information Processing Systems, J.J Clark and A.L. Yuille, Kluwer Academic Publisheres, Boston, 1990.

Highly cited articles (more than 1200 citations) 

 2017 with LC Chen, G Papandreou, I Kokkinos, K Murphy, Deeplab: Semantic image segmentation with deep convolutional nets, atrous convolution, and fully connected crfs, in: IEEE Transactions on Pattern Analysis and Machine Intelligence. Vol. 40, nº 4; 834-848.
 1996 with SC Zhu, Region competition: Unifying snakes, region growing, and Bayes/MDL for multiband image segmentation, in: IEEE Transactions on Pattern Analysis and Machine Intelligence. Vol. 18, nº 9; 884-900.
 1992 with PW Hallinan, DS Cohen, Feature extraction from faces using deformable templates, in: International Journal of Computer Vision. Vol. 8, nº 2; 99-111.
 2004 with D Kersten, P Mamassian, Object perception as Bayesian inference, in: Annual Review of Psychology. Vol. 55; 271-304.

References 

Living people
Alumni of the University of Cambridge
Johns Hopkins University faculty
American computer scientists
1955 births
Smith-Kettlewell Eye Research Institute people